Patrizicampa is a genus of two-pronged bristletails in the family Campodeidae.

References

Further reading

 
 
 

Diplura